Christian T. Petersen is a game designer who has worked primarily on board games and role-playing games.

Early life 
Christian T. Petersen was born in the United States, but grew up in Denmark; he was still in high school there when he founded Pegasus Spil Import – a company that imported Avalon Hill games into Scandinavia – and Games Weekend – Denmark's second gaming convention. Petersen returned to the United States in 1991 and began studying for his BA in Economics at St. Olaf College in Northfield, Minnesota.

Fantasy Flight Games
In June 1995, after four years of college, Petersen founded Fantasy Flight Publishing. The name for Fantasy Flight originates with Petersen's first company, Pegasus Spil Imports; Petersen originally wanted to call his new company Pegasus Publishing but he found Pegasus used too often by other companies and instead he chose a name that was representative of the pegasus: a fantasy flight.

The original idea for the Fantasy Flight Games company came from Petersen's love of European comics, and by negotiating with European publishers Petersen came up with the rights to three comic books: Lucky Luke, Spirou & Fantasio and Percevan. He started off publishing the comics he had licensed, and when he found out that people wanted more popular European comics like Asterix and Tintin, he started importing and distributing those and when he discovered that people were interested in him distributing even more books, he started doing that too, creating Downtown Distribution. From reading Comics & Games Retailer, Petersen had good data about the gaming field available to him, so, combining this with his Danish gaming expertise, Petersen started getting into game publication by designing Twilight Imperium (1997).

Fantasy Flight Publishing became known as Fantasy Flight Games (FFG), and by early 1998 Fantasy Flight sold off Downtown Distribution – which represented the last remnant of its comic business – and thereafter focused almost entirely on the gaming market. Petersen was a long-time fan of Chaosium's Call of Cthulhu, and because of this interest, Petersen decided that he would like his new publishing company to produce Call of Cthulhu material – and so he acquired a license from Chaosium to publish a series of supplements. With Darrell Hardy, Petersen wrote the Nocturnum trilogy of adventures for Call of Cthulhu: Long Shades (1997), Hollow Winds (1998) and Deep Secrets (1999). Petersen and Kevin Wilson designed the Game of Thrones (2003) wargame, and Doom: The Boardgame (2004).

As CEO of Fantasy Flight Games, Petersen led the company to publish more than 400 titles, making it one of the most successful publishers in the hobby games industry. In addition to his responsibilities as CEO, Petersen managed the day-to-day operations of Fantasy Flight's development and design department. Petersen designed many of Fantasy Flight's games throughout the years, including Twilight Imperium (all editions), the A Game of Thrones board game, World of Warcraft: The Board Game, and The Lord of the Rings Trivia Game, and his credits as co-designer include Diskwars and Vortex (also entitled Maelstrom) with Tom Jolly, the A Game of Thrones CCG with Eric Lang, and The StarCraft Board Game with Corey Konieczka.  Christian T. Petersen served as its CEO until FFG's merger with Asmodee in 2014, at which time he moved into his role as CEO of Asmodee North America. On July 30, 2018, it was announced that Petersen would be  stepping down from his role as CEO of Asmodee North America at the end of 2018.

References

External links
 Christian T. Petersen :: Pen & Paper RPG Database archive

Board game designers
Living people
Place of birth missing (living people)
Role-playing game designers
St. Olaf College alumni
Year of birth missing (living people)